Christopher Addison, 2nd Viscount Addison (8 December 1904 – 18 November 1976), was a British peer. The son of Christopher Addison, 1st Viscount Addison, he succeeded the viscountcy on the death of his father in 1951.

Lord Addison married Brigit Helen Christine Williams (d. 1980), on 10 September 1928, with whom he had the following children:
Hon. Jacqueline Faith Addison (b. 2 March 1944)
Hon. Christine Gray Addison (b. 3 September 1946)

As he left no male heir, he was succeeded by his brother Michael.

Arms

References

External links

1904 births
1976 deaths
Christopher 2